El Rosario may refer to:

Places

Argentina 
 El Rosario, Catamarca, a municipality in Catamarca Province

Colombia 
 El Rosario, Nariño, a municipality in the Nariño Departmen

Costa Rica 
El Rosario District

El Salvador 
El Rosario, Cuscatlán, a municipality in the Cuscatlán department
El Rosario, La Paz, a municipality in the La Paz department
El Rosario, Morazán, a municipality in the Morazán department

Guatemala 
El Rosario Lake, in El Rosario National Park

Honduras 
El Rosario, Comayagua, a municipality in the department of Comayagua.
El Rosario, Olancho, a municipality in the department of Olancho.

Mexico 
El Rosario, Baja California, a municipality in the Baja California. 
El Rosario, Sinaloa, a municipality in the state of Sinaloa. 
El Rosario metro station, a station of the Mexico City Metro
El Rosario (Mexico City Metrobús), a BRT station in Mexico City

Nicaragua 
El Rosario, Carazo, a municipality in the Carazo department of Nicaragua

Spain 
El Rosario, Tenerife, a municipality in the island of Tenerife in the province of Santa Cruz de Tenerife, on the Canary Islands

Other 
 El rosario, 1944 Mexican romantic drama film directed by Juan José Ortega

See also
Rosario (disambiguation)